Karaşar is a village in the Göynücek District, Amasya Province, Turkey. Its population is 356 (2021).

References

Villages in Göynücek District